Bwera General Hospital, also Bwera Hospital, is a hospital in the Western Region of Uganda.

Location 
The coordinates of Bwera General Hospital are: 0°02'02.0"N, 29°46'01.0"E (Latitude:0.033899; Longitude:29.766934).

Overview 
Bwera General Hospital is a public hospital owned by the Uganda Ministry of Health. It serves the surrounding sub-counties in Kasese District, and patients from neighboring Democratic Republic of the Congo. It is the only government-owned hospital in Kasese District, as of May 2016. The hospital's bed capacity is 100, although many times it admits up to 300.

Like most government hospitals in the country, Bwera General Hospital faces many challenges including non-functioning equipment, under-staffing, poor funding, over-worked staff and slow payment of staff.

Ebola 
The hospital has an Ebola treatment unit which treated patients in June 2019 during the 2018–20 Kivu Ebola epidemic affecting neighbouring Democratic Republic of Congo.

See also 
List of hospitals in Uganda

References

External links 
 Website of Uganda Ministry of Health
 Cholera outbreak confirmed in Kasese – 19 March 2016

Hospitals in Uganda
Kasese District
Rwenzururu sub-region
Western Region, Uganda
Hospitals established in 2000
2000 establishments in Uganda